Edward Berger (born 1970) is an Austrian and Swiss director and screenwriter. He notably directed German films Jack (2014), All My Loving (2019), and All Quiet on the Western Front (2022). For the latter, Berger won multiple awards including the Oscar for best international feature film, BAFTA awards for Best Direction and Adapted Screenplay.

Life and work
Edward Berger graduated from Theodor-Heuss-Gymnasium in Wolfsburg. Born in Germany, he holds Swiss citizenship as his mother was from Switzerland and Austrian citizenship through his father. He attended the Hochschule für Bildende Künste Braunschweig from 1990 to 1991 and then transferred to the Tisch School of the Arts at New York University, where he finished his studies in directing in 1994. At NYU, he created numerous short films, which were screened at many international film festivals. He gathered his first work experience at the U.S. Independent Production company Good Machine, working, among others, on the films of Ang Lee and Todd Haynes. Additionally, Edward Berger gave lectures and carried out workshops at Columbia University, and at Universität der Künste Berlin and at the HFF Potsdam.

Edward Berger has lived in Berlin since 1997. His first feature based on his own screenplay was Gomez. He also worked as a screenplay author and director for episodes of the television series KDD – Kriminaldauerdienst. Aside from television productions, for which Edward Berger frequently wrote screenplays, he has also directed films. In 2012, his film  was awarded the Grimme-Preis. His film Jack was invited for the Berlinale 2014 and awarded the 2015 German Film Award in silver for the best feature film. Since August 2014, Berger has directed the first five episodes of the eight-part television series Deutschland 83 for UFA Fiction, which premiered at 2015 Berlinale in the section Berlinale Special. In 2022, Berger co-wrote and directed All Quiet on the Western Front, for which he received an Academy Award for Best Picture nomination, an Academy Award for Best Adapted Screenplay nomination and won the BAFTA Award for Best Direction and the BAFTA Award for Best Adapted Screenplay.

Filmography (select)
 1998: Gomez – Kopf oder Zahl (screenwriter and director)
 2001: Female 2 Seeks Happy End (screenwriter and director)
 2001, 2002: Schimanski (crime series; directed two episodes)
 2004: Bloch (television series; directed the episode Schwestern )
 2005, 2006: Unter Verdacht (television series; screenwriter for two episodes; directed one episode)
 2006: Tatort (crime series; directed the episode )
 2007: Windland (television film; director)
 2008: KDD – Kriminaldauerdienst (crime series; director of three episodes and book with two episodes)
 2010: Polizeiruf 110 (crime series; screenwriter and director of the episode Aquarius)
 2011:  (television film, (screenwriter and director)
 2012:  (television film; director)
 2013: Tatort (crime series; director of the episode )
 2014: Jack (screenwriter and director)
 2015: Deutschland 83 (television series)
 2018: The Terror (television series)
 2018: Patrick Melrose (television series)
 2019: All My Loving (screenwriter and director)
 2020: Your Honor (television series)
 2022: All Quiet on the Western Front (screenwriter and director)
 TBA: Conclave (director)

Awards and prizes
 1998: Winner of the Film Prize of the City Lünen at the Kinofest Lünen for Gomez – Kopf oder Zahl
 2000: Variety Award "Ten European Directors To Watch" for Female 2 Seeks Happy End
 2003: Nomination for the Adolf-Grimme-Preis for the episode Asyl – crime series Schimanski
 2004: Nomination for the International Emmy Award for the episode Asyl – crime series Schimanski
 2012: Adolf-Grimme-Preis for A Good Summer
 2013: Nomination for the Adolf-Grimme-Preis for Mom's Gotta Go
 2013: Nomination for the Hamburger Krimipreis for Mom's Gotta Go
 2014: Audience Prize at the filmkunstfest Mecklenburg-Vorpommern in Schwerin for Jack
 2014: Audience Prize at the Festival of German Film in Ludwigshafen for Jack
 2014: Prize for the best screenplay at the Fünf-Seen-Filmfestival in Starnberg for Jack
 2014: Filmfest Lünen, School Children aged 10+ Prize for Jack
 2014: Deutscher Regiepreis Metropolis for best film for Jack
 2015: Bavarian Film Prize for Jack, VGF Bester Nachwuchsproduzent
 2015: TV-Festival Séries Mania Paris, Best World Drama for Deutschland 83
 2015: European Youth Film Festival of Flanders, Best Feature Film for Jack
 2015: Nomination for the German Film Prize Lola in the categories Best Screenplay, Best Director, Best Feature Film for Jack
 2015: German Film Prize in Silver for the Best Feature Film for Jack
 2022: National Board of Review Award for Best Adapted Screenplay for All Quiet on the Western Front
 2022: San Diego Film Critics Society Award for Best Adapted Screenplay for All Quiet on the Western Front
 2023: BAFTA Award for Best Direction for All Quiet on the Western Front
 2023: BAFTA Award for Best Adapted Screenplay for All Quiet on the Western Front
 2023: Academy Award for Best International Feature Film for All Quiet on the Western Front

References

External links

1970 births
Living people
20th-century German screenwriters
21st-century German screenwriters
German film directors
Mass media people from Lower Saxony
Best Director BAFTA Award winners
Best Adapted Screenplay BAFTA Award winners
Filmmakers who won the Best Foreign Language Film BAFTA Award
People from Wolfsburg
Directors of Best Foreign Language Film Academy Award winners